The Missouri State Bears football program is the college football team that represents Missouri State University located in Springfield, Missouri, United States. Missouri State competes in the NCAA Division I Football Championship Subdivision (FCS) and are members of the Missouri Valley Football Conference.

The school was known as Southwest Missouri State until 2005 when they changed the name to Missouri State. Missouri State's first football team was fielded in 1909 and the first coach in program history was Walter Langston who went 4–2 in his only season as head coach. Prior to 1923, the team competed as an Independent. From 1923 to 1980, Missouri State were members of the Mid-America Intercollegiate Athletics Association, of which Missouri State was a founding member. During that time the Bears were classified in the NCAA College Division from 1958 to 1972. From 1973 to 1980 the Bears played in NCAA Division II. Missouri State moved up to the Association of Mid-Continent Universities in time for the 1981 season, which was their first season in Division I-AA. In 1985 the Bears became a founding member of the Gateway Football Conference which later became the Missouri Valley Football Conference in 2008.

Missouri State has an all-time record of 488–525–39 and have won 10 conference championships. They won their most recent conference championship in 2020. Missouri State was ranked second in the country for 3 weeks from October 15 to 29, 1990. This is still the highest ranking in school history. The team plays its home games at the 17,500-seat Robert W. Plaster Stadium which has been its home since 1941. The Bears have had 22 head coaches in their history, including their current head coach Ryan Beard.

History

Classifications
1958–1972: NCAA College Division
1973–1980: NCAA Division II
1982–present: NCAA Division I–AA/FCS

Conference memberships
1909–1923: Independent 
1924–1981: Mid-America Intercollegiate Athletics Association†
1981–1984: Mid-Continent Conference
1985–present: Gateway Football Conference/Missouri Valley Football Conference†
†Founding member of the conference

Head coaches

Since 1909, the Missouri State Bears have had 22 different head coaches. The first coach in program history was Walter Langston who coached the team for one year. Arthur Briggs is the longest tenured head coach with two non consecutive runs as head coach. He coached the Bears for 20 seasons in total. The current coach is Ryan Beard who was hired on December 16, 2022. There was no team for the 1913 season. Due to World War II, Missouri State did not field a team for the 1943–1944 seasons.

Facilities

Plaster Stadium
Missouri State plays all home games at Plaster Stadium, which has been their home since 1941. From its opening in 1941 to 1991 the stadium was known as Briggs Stadium. The stadium currently seats 17,500 people. It has undergone several major renovations in 1991 and, most recently, in 2014. After the 1991 renovation which added an upper deck on the west side and a row of sky-boxes and press box, the stadium was renamed in honor of Robert W. Plaster who provided the major gift for the project. The Stadium was updated in 2008 with a new video board behind the south endzone. The 2014 renovation made significant changes to the East side of the stadium and the playing surface. The track was removed and the East side was completely rebuilt. The stadium record attendance is 18,386 which was at the 2014 home opener versus North Dakota. Plaster Stadium is the 4th-largest stadium in the conference and the second-largest college football specific venue in Missouri.

Largest crowds

Indoor practice facility
In July 2018 it was reported that Missouri State was undergoing the process of securing funding to build an indoor practice facility. In a phone interview with the Springfield News-Leader, athletic director Kyle Moats talked at length about the facility. Missouri State would build the indoor facility entirely through private donations to the athletic department. The facility was to be built on the existing ROTC and band practice field. The school's athletic director Kyle Moats said  "From a recruiting standpoint, others in the conference have one," Moats said. "We need to at least try and put people on equal bases." He also was quoted that the facility would be a part of their plan to continually upgrade team's facilities. The indoor facility would also be shared by some of the other athletic programs at Missouri State.  In November 2019, athletic director Kyle Moats gave an update to "The Standard", the Missouri State student newspaper. He said the athletic department wasn't able to achieve the funding they needed to build the facility as some other programs became more important to address first. He said they had decided to use a more cost efficient approach and decided to build a dome over Betty and Bobby Allison North Stadium instead, to save the department over $10-$15 million. Moats said that the facility would be used by the club lacrosse team, football, Soccer,  Track,  Baseball and Softball. In the interview Moats said “We wouldn’t be gaining any traction, we’d just be catching up,” and We’re not trying to have the Taj Mahal, just an indoor facility.” As of October 2021 there hasn't been anymore news on the facility.

South end zone facility
In late October 2021, Missouri State announced plans to build a facility in the South end zone of Plaster Stadium. The facility would house the team locker room, meeting rooms, coaches offices, and club seating. A new and upgraded video board would be added on top of the building as well. The estimated cost of the facility would be around $20 million. "We want to try to improve our position and be a contender in FCS football and be a contender for a national championship," Athletic Director Kyle Moats said.

Honored jerseys 
Missouri State has retired four jerseys which are memorialized over the student section of the stadium's East side, but the numbers are still available and can be chosen by future players.

Notes

Championships

Conference championships
Missouri State have won ten conference championships in their history. The Bears won 7 championships in the MIAA, 2 championships in the Gateway, and one in the Missouri Valley. The first conference championship was won in 1928 under coach Arthur Briggs. Jesse Branch is the only coach to win multiple conference championships. The 1928,1990, 2020 championships were shared titles. The Bears won their most recent conference championship in 2020, when they shared the conference title with North Dakota and South Dakota State. This title ended the 30 year conference championship drought.

Postseason appearances

Division I-AA/FCS playoffs

Missouri State has appeared in the FCS playoffs three times. Under head coach Jesse Branch, the Bears made two straight trips in 1989 and 1990. In 1989 they drew a first round matchup with the Maine Black Bears. Missouri State won 38–35 and advanced to play the Stephen F. Austin Lumberjacks in the Quarterfinals where they lost 55–25. Missouri State made it to the playoffs again in the 1990 season. They played at home against the Idaho Vandals and lost 41–35. Bobby Petrino led the Bears to their 3rd playoff appearance in 2020 and the team lost at North Dakota 44-10. Missouri State made their 4th playoff appearance in 2021 when they hosted UT Martin in the first round. All of the Bears playoff appearances have come in back to back years, 1989-1990 and 2020-2021. Their all time record is 1–4.

Bowl games
Missouri State has appeared in four bowl games and are 0–4 all time. 

 Note: The 1989 Pecan Bowl was the Midwest Regional Championship (FCS Playoff Quarterfinal).

Records

Record vs. MIAA teams

Record vs. former MVFC teams

Record vs. current MVFC teams

†note: North Dakota joined the Missouri Valley Football Conference in 2020. The Bears played them twice in non-conference and once in the FCS Playoffs.

Notable players

Current NFL players

Former NFL players

Future opponents
Announced schedules as of May, 2022

Note: † Homecoming, # Thursday night game, * Conference match-up

References

External links

 

 
American football teams established in 1909
1909 establishments in Missouri